The World University Wrestling Championships, an international competition in Wrestling, have been held in alternate years since 1968 each time in a different host city.

Editions

Champions

Men's Freestyle

Men's Greco-Roman

Women's Freestyle

References

Sources 
 13th World University Wrestling Championship 2018
 12th World University Wrestling Championship 2016
 11th World University Wrestling Championship 2014

Wrestling competitions
World University Wrestling Championships